William Annis may refer to:

 Billy Annis (1874–1938), English football player
 William Annis, founding member of electronic pop band Null Device